Jørn Stian Dahl (born 5 January 1973) is a Norwegian bobsledder. He competed in the four man event at the 1998 Winter Olympics.

References

1973 births
Living people
Norwegian male bobsledders
Olympic bobsledders of Norway
Bobsledders at the 1998 Winter Olympics
Sportspeople from Tønsberg